Aleksandar Simić (born January 22, 1973) is a Serbian composer.

He is the composer of Portrait of Marshal Zhukov, commemorating 50 years of victory over fascism, and he composed the anthem for Belgrade's 2009 University Games. A program of music commissioned from Simić by the United Nations in Serbia was performed at a 2011 concert in Belgrade to commemorate the UN's 66th anniversary.  
The Vatican commissioned a mass from Simić that commemorated the 950 years of the East-West Schism, and he composed a tango accompaniment for a contestant in the 2009 World Figure Skating Championships in Los Angeles.

References

External links
 
 St. Petersburg Times: Yugoslav Composer Finds Niche in Petersburg

1973 births
21st-century classical composers
Serbian composers
Living people
Male classical composers
21st-century male musicians